St Peter's Cathedral is the Anglican cathedral in Hamilton, located in the Waikato region of the North Island of New Zealand. It is located on a small hill, known as Cathedral Hill (Pukerangiora in Māori), in the southern central part of the city off Victoria Street .

Overview 
St Peter's Cathedral serves as the cathedral church for the Bishop and Diocese of Waikato, the surrounding region. The Diocese is one of seven diocese in Aotearoa, forming part of the Anglican Communion around the world.  The choir is a mixed-voice choir consisting of 24 singers.

Close by to the north of the cathedral on the other side of the street is Waikato Museum. On the opposite side of the Waikato River over the Victoria Bridge is the Roman Catholic cathedral, the Cathedral of the Blessed Virgin Mary, Hamilton.

The senior priest of the cathedral is called a Dean.

History 
The first Anglican church was built in Hamilton and was almost completed in 1867, but burnt down in that year. A second church was built in 1871 but was considered unsatisfactory. On land at the base of the current cathedral site, a third church was dedicated in 1884 and consecrated in 1887. The present St Peter's Cathedral, the fourth Anglican church in the succession of buildings, was completed in 1916. It was modelled on a 15th-century church in Norfolk, England. The building was designed in ferro-concrete by Warren and Blechynden of Hamilton and was the third on this site.

The 8 bells of the cathedral were cast by the Mears & Stainbank foundry of Whitechapel, London. The tenor bell (the bell with the lowest pitch) was purchased in 1931 and installed in 1933. The remaining six bells were added in October 1948 after fund-raising. Ringing is undertaken by members of The Australian and New Zealand Association of Bellringers.

St Peter's Cathedral was registered by the New Zealand Historic Places Trust (now Heritage New Zealand) as a Category II historic building on 5 September 1985 with registration number 4206.

21st century
The cathedral hosted a meeting for the Hamilton mayoral election, 2016. A multi-coloured light show at the cathedral was planned for December 2016.

See also 
 List of cathedrals in New Zealand

References

External links 
 Alternative web address
 St Peter's Cathedral blog, WordPress

1867 establishments in New Zealand
Churches completed in 1916
Hamilton
Hamilton
Churches in Hamilton, New Zealand
Tourist attractions in Hamilton, New Zealand
Culture in Hamilton, New Zealand
Heritage New Zealand Category 2 historic places in Waikato
Listed churches in New Zealand
1910s architecture in New Zealand